Imperial Noble Consort Zhuangshun (29 November 1822 – 13 December 1866), of the Manchu Uya clan, was a consort of the Daoguang Emperor. She was 40 years his junior.

Life

Family background
Imperial Noble Consort Zhuangshun's personal name was not recorded in history.

 Father: Lingshou (1788–1824), served as a sixth rank literary official
 Paternal grandfather: Bailu
Paternal grandmother: Lady Zhou (周氏) 
 Mother: Lady Weng (翁氏)
 One younger brother: Xilin (禧霖)

Daoguang era
The future Imperial Noble Consort Zhuangshun was born on the 16th day of the tenth lunar month in the second year of the reign of the Daoguang Emperor, which translates to 29 November 1822 in the Gregorian calendar.

In March or April 1837, Lady Uya entered the Forbidden City and was granted the title "Noble Lady Lin" by the Daoguang Emperor. On 3 December 1837, she was demoted to "First Attendant Xiu". On 31 August 1839, she was restored as "Noble Lady Lin". On 16 October 1840, she gave birth to the emperor's seventh son, Yixuan.

In November or December 1840, Lady Uya was elevated to "Concubine Lin". On 24 March 1842, she gave birth to the emperor's ninth daughter, Princess Shouzhuang of the First Rank.

In June or July 1842, Lady Uya was elevated to "Consort Lin". She gave birth on 14 March 1844 to the emperor's eighth son, Yihe, and on 15 November 1845 to his ninth son, Yihui. In January or February 1847, she was elevated to "Noble Consort Lin".

Xianfeng era
The Daoguang Emperor died on 26 February 1850 and was succeeded by his fourth son Yizhu, who was enthroned as the Xianfeng Emperor. The Xianfeng Emperor granted Lady Uya the title "Dowager Noble Consort Lin".

Tongzhi era
The Xianfeng Emperor died on 22 August 1861 and was succeeded by his first son Zaichun, who was enthroned as the Tongzhi Emperor. The Tongzhi Emperor elevated Lady Uya to "Grand Dowager Imperial Noble Consort Lin" in November or December 1861.

Lady Uya died on 13 December 1866 and was granted the posthumous title "Imperial Noble Consort Zhuangshun". In 1867, she was interred in the Mu Mausoleum of the Western Qing tombs.

Guangxu era
On 25 February 1875, Yixuan's second son, Zaitian, was enthroned as the Guangxu Emperor. The Guangxu Emperor increased the amount of offerings at Lady Uya's tomb and had more ancestral worship rites performed for her.

Titles
 During the reign of the Daoguang Emperor (r. 1820–1850):
 Lady Uya (烏亞施;from 29 November 1822)
 Noble Lady Lin (from March/April 1837), sixth rank consort
 Attendant Xiu (from 3 December 1837), seventh rank consort
 Noble Lady Lin (from 31 August 1839), sixth rank consort
 Concubine Lin (from November/December 1840), fifth rank consort
 Consort Lin (from June/July 1842), fourth rank consort
 Noble Consort Lin (from January/February 1847), third rank consort
 During the reign of the Xianfeng Emperor (r. 1850-1861):
 Dowager Noble Consort Lin
 During the reign of the Tongzhi Emperor (r. 1861–1875):
 Grand Dowager Imperial Noble Consort Lin (from November/December 1861)
 Imperial Noble Consort Zhuangshun (from December 1866), second rank title

Issue
 As Noble Lady Lin:
 Yixuan (16 October 1840 – 1 January 1891), the Daoguang Emperor's seventh son, granted the title Prince Chun of the Second Rank in 1850, elevated to Prince Chun of the First Rank in 1872, posthumously honoured as Prince Chunxian of the First Rank
 As Concubine Lin:
 Princess Shouzhuang of the First Rank (24 March 1842 – 11 March 1884), the Daoguang Emperor's ninth daughter
 Married Dehui (d. 1859) of the Bolod clan in December 1859 or January 1860
 As Consort Lin:
 Yihe (14 March 1844 – 17 December 1868), the Daoguang Emperor's eighth son, granted the title Prince Zhong of the Second Rank in 1850, posthumously honoured as Prince Zhongduan of the Second Rank
 Yihui (15 November 1845 – 22 March 1877), the Daoguang Emperor's ninth son, granted the title Prince Fu of the Second Rank in 1850, posthumously honoured as Prince Fujing of the Second Rank
 As Noble Consort Lin:
 Miscarriage (1848)

Gallery

In fiction and popular culture
 Portrayed by Sherry Chen in Curse of the Royal Harem (2011)

See also
 Ranks of imperial consorts in China#Qing
 Royal and noble ranks of the Qing dynasty

Notes

References
 

1822 births
1866 deaths
Consorts of the Daoguang Emperor
Manchu nobility